The City and County of Denver, Colorado, is located at 39°43'35" North, 104°57'56" West (39.726287, −104.965486) in the Colorado Front Range region.  The Southern Rocky Mountains lie to the west of Denver and the High Plains lie to the east.

According to the United States Census Bureau, the city has a total area of 401.3 km² (154.9 mi²). 397.2 km² (153.4 mi²) of it is land and 4.1 km² (1.6 mi²) of it is water. The total area is 1.03% water.

Adjacent counties
Adams County, Colorado - north and east
Arapahoe County, Colorado - south and east and southeastern enclaves
Jefferson County, Colorado - west

Adjacent Cities
City of Commerce City - north
City of Brighton – north (separated by a strip of unincorporated Adams County)
City of Aurora – east
City of Glendale – southeastern enclave
City of Greenwood Village - south
City of Cherry Hills Village - south
City of Englewood -south
City of Sheridan -south
Town of Bow Mar - south
City of Littleton - south
City of Lakewood -west
City of Edgewater -west
City of Wheat Ridge -west
Town of Mountain View -west
Town of Lakeside - west
City of Arvada – northwest (separated by a strip of unincorporated Jefferson County)
Berkley CDP - north
North Washington CDP - north

Climate

Denver features a semi-arid climate (Köppen climate classification: BSk) with very low humidity and around 3,100 hours of sunshine per year. The weather of the city and surrounding area is influenced by the proximity of the Rocky Mountains to the west. The climate, while generally mild compared to the mountains to the west and the plains further east, can be moderately unpredictable. Measurable amounts of snow have fallen in Denver as late as Memorial Day and as early as Labor Day. Most recently, Denver received an inch of snow on September 8, 2020, making this the second earliest measurable snowfall on record.

The average window for measurable (≥) snowfall is October 17 thru April 27, averaging  of seasonal accumulation for 1981−2010. Denver averages 270 clear and partly cloudy days per year or 3200 hours of sunshine making it one of the sunniest major cities. Denver receives more precipitation than most locations with semi-arid climates, but still features a semi-arid climate due to its high evapotranspiration.

Denver's winters are normally dry and range from mild to moderately cold, and although large amounts of snow can fall on the mountains just west of the city, the effects of orographic lift dry out the air passing over the Front Range shadowing the city from precipitation for much of the season. Additionally, warm chinook winds can occasionally be felt as air passing over the mountains heats as it descends, bringing a melting snow cover and surging temperatures; from December to February there is an average of 12−18 days of + highs and 1−3 days of above-freezing lows per month.

Spring brings with it significant changes as Denver can be affected by air masses on all sides, whether arctic air from the north, which occasionally combines with Pacific storm fronts bringing snow to the city. As reported at Denver International, March is the second snowiest month, averaging  of snow. Additionally, warm air from the Gulf of Mexico can bring the first thunderstorms of the season, and continental warm air can bring summer-like warm and dry conditions. The last freeze of the season on average falls on May 6.
Starting in mid-July, the monsoon brings tropical moisture into the city, and with it comes occasional short late-afternoon thunderstorms. However, despite this tropical moisture, humidity levels during the day generally remain very low, and lows rarely remain at or above . There are 38 days of + highs per year, though + highs are not seen annually. The average window for temperatures reaching the former threshold is June 4 thru September 7.

In the autumn, the tropical monsoon flow dies down and as arctic air begins to approach it can combine with moisture from the Pacific Northwest to bring snowfall to the city – November is Denver's third snowiest month, and both the greatest snowfall from a single storm and daily snow depth on record occurred before the Winter Solstice.

Extreme statistics (since 1872 unless otherwise indicated):
All-time record high:  on August 8, 1878, July 20, 2005, June 25−26, 2012, and June 28, 2018.
The All-time record low:  on January 9, 1875
Lowest daily maximum:  on February 3, 1883
Highest daily minimum:  on July 3, 1881
Highest daily average:  on June 26, 2012
Lowest daily average:  on January 11, 1963
Highest 24-hour precipitation:  on May 22, 1876.
Highest monthly precipitation:  during May 1876
Lowest monthly precipitation: none during December 1881; trace monthly precipitation has occurred several times, the last being November 1949.
Highest annual precipitation:  during 1967
Lowest annual precipitation:  during 2002

Highest 24-hour snowfall:  on December 24, 1982
Highest one-storm total:  from December 1−6, 1913.
Highest daily snow depth (since 1921):  November 4−5, 1946
Highest monthly snowfall:  during December 1913
Highest seasonal snowfall:  during 1908−09
Lowest seasonal snowfall:  during 1888−89

Neighborhoods

Denver has 79 neighborhoods that the City and community groups use for planning and administration. Although the City's delineation of the neighborhood boundaries is somewhat arbitrary, the City's definitions of its neighborhoods roughly correspond to those used by residents.

Denver also has a number of neighborhoods not reflected in the City's administrative neighborhoods. Sometimes these neighborhoods reflect the way people in an area identify themselves; sometimes they reflect how others, such as real estate developers, have defined those areas.

Among the neighborhoods commonly spoken of are historic and trendy LoDo (short for "Lower Downtown"), part of the City's Union Station neighborhood; Capitol Hill, Washington Park; Uptown, part of the North Capitol Hill neighborhood; Curtis Park, part of the Five Points neighborhood; Alamo Placita, the northern part of the Speer neighborhood; and the Golden Triangle, roughly the Civic Center neighborhood.

Transportation

Grid system

Most of Denver has a straightforward street grid oriented to the four cardinal directions. Blocks are usually identified in hundreds from the median streets, identified as "0", which are Broadway (the west-east median) and Ellsworth Avenue (the north-south median). Colfax Avenue, the major east-west artery through Denver, is 15 blocks (1500 North) of the median. Avenues north of Ellsworth are numbered (except for Colfax Avenue and a few others), while avenues south of Ellsworth are named.

There is also an older downtown grid system that was designed to be parallel to the confluence of the South Platte River and Cherry Creek. Most of the streets downtown and in LoDo run northeast-southwest and northwest-southeast. This system has an unplanned benefit for  snow removal; if the streets were in a normal N-S/E-W grid, only the N-S streets would get sun. With the grid pointed in diagonal directions, the NW-SE streets get the sun to melt snow in the morning and the NE-SW streets get it in the afternoon. The NW-SE streets are numbered, while the NE-SW streets are named. The named streets start at the intersection of Colfax Avenue and Broadway with the block-long Cheyenne Place. The numbered streets start underneath the Colfax and I-25 viaducts. There are 27 named and 44 numbered streets on this grid. There are also a few vestiges of the old grid system in the normal grid, such as Park Avenue, Morrison Road, and Speer Boulevard.

Highways
Denver is primarily served by the interstate highways I-25 and I-70. The intersection of the two interstates is referred to locally as "the mousetrap." I-70 runs east-west from Utah to Baltimore, Maryland. I-25 runs north-south from the New Mexico border through Denver to Buffalo, Wyoming. I-225 traverses neighboring Aurora and connects with I-25 in the southeastern corner of Denver. Additionally, I-76 begins from I-70 just west of the city of Arvada. It intersects I-25 north of the city and runs northeast to Nebraska where it ends at I-80. U.S. Highway 6 connects downtown Denver to the suburb of Golden.

A highway expansion and transit project, dubbed "T-REX", was recently completed along the I-25 corridor. The project included the addition of extra freeway lanes, the redesign of several highway overpasses, and a light rail line along the I-25 corridor between downtown Denver and the Denver Technological Center. The massive project was finished in the Fall of 2006, ahead of schedule and under budget.

Public transit

Mass transportation throughout the Denver-Aurora metropolitan area is managed and coordinated by the Regional Transportation District (RTD). RTD currently operates more than 1,000 buses serving 10,000 bus stops in 38 municipal jurisdictions. Additionally, RTD operates seven light rail lines (the C Line, D Line, E Line, F Line, H Line, R Line, and the W Line) as well as two commuter rail lines serving a total of 53 stations. The current RTD local fare is $2.25. FasTracks, an expansion project approved by voters in 2004, will allow the light rail to serve cities such as Lakewood, Golden, and Aurora. Commuter rail lines will serve Boulder, Longmont, and the Denver International Airport, augmenting existing light rail extending from the downtown area to C-470 servicing the Denver suburbs.

Inter-city rail
Passenger train service to Denver is provided by Amtrak's California Zephyr, which runs from Chicago to the San Francisco Bay Area with major stops in Omaha, Denver, Salt Lake City, and Reno. Additionally, the Winter Park Express provides winter weekend service from Denver to Winter Park Resort. Both trains stop at Denver's historic Union Station, where travelers can transfer to RTD's 16th Street Free MallRide or use light rail to tour the city.

Airports

Denver International Airport is the eleventh busiest airport in the world, and sixth in the U.S. In 2005, it handled 43.4 million passengers. In land area it is the largest airport in the United States, covering 53 sq. miles.
Formerly Stapleton International Airport (replaced by Denver International Airport and closed in 1995)
Formerly Lowry Air Force Base (flights stopped around 1965)

Notes

References

External links
The City and County of Denver